Christian Fabián Callejas Rodríguez (born 17 May 1978) is a Uruguayan former football player and current manager.

Honours

Hibernians
 Maltese Premier League
Champion, 2008–09

Uruguay
 Copa América
 Runner-up: 1999

External links
Profile at Tenfield

1978 births
Living people
Uruguayan footballers
Uruguayan expatriate footballers
Uruguay under-20 international footballers
Uruguay international footballers
1997 FIFA Confederations Cup players
1999 Copa América players
2001 Copa América players
Uruguayan Primera División players
Danubio F.C. players
Centro Atlético Fénix players
FC Lugano players
Racing Club de Montevideo players
Club Olimpia footballers
Hibernians F.C. players
Expatriate footballers in Switzerland
Expatriate footballers in Paraguay
Expatriate footballers in Malta
Association football midfielders
Footballers from Montevideo